Rolv Henden (1914 – 1992) is a Norwegian businessperson and resistance member.

He was born in Sandane. During the Second World War he made his mark as a secret agent in the organization XU. In his civic career he was the managing director of Firda Billag from 1940 to 1982.

References

1914 births
1992 deaths
People from Gloppen
20th-century Norwegian businesspeople
XU
Norwegian resistance members